Ulla Rossek (born 1978) is a German artist.
 
In 1999–2003, she studied at Academy of Fine Arts, Munich.
In 2003–2004, she studied at Städelschule Frankfurt.
She lives and works in Berlin.

Awards
2005 	Villa Romana prize

Exhibitions
2009
01.05.09–30.05.09 Laure Prouvost / Ulla Rossek "after the butcher", Berlin
2008
26.04.07–26.05.07 Tension; Sex; Despair Kunsthalle Exnergasse, Wien
2006		
07.05.06–09.05.06 Ulla Rossek / Freitagskueche General Public, Berlin
2005
05.03.05–01.05.05 "Wer von diesen sieben ...", Studiogalerie Kunstverein Braunschweig
2004
"Villa Romana-Preisträger", Von der Heydt Museum Wuppertal
"Adolph, Bohl, Breuer, Kleefeld, Rossek, Stahl", Kjubh-Raum, Cologne
05.06.04–03.07.04 "The Savoy", Collective Gallery, Edinburgh
Opening of the Rossek/Stahl Exhibition Gallery together with Lucie Stahl
2003
"The state of the upper floor: panorama"
Exhibition project by Michael Beutler, Kunstverein Munich

References

20th-century German painters
21st-century German painters
German women painters
1978 births
Living people
Academy of Fine Arts, Munich alumni
20th-century German women
21st-century German women